The Independent is a weekly newspaper in Livermore, California, United States, established in 1963. The paper is offered to residents and businesses in Livermore, Pleasanton, Dublin, and Sunol for free. As of May 2020, its editor is Aly Brown.

In 1972, The Independent came out in support of Proposition B, a local measure titled the Save All Valley Environment Initiative (SAVE) designed to curb local development in the region. While the proposition was successful, the paper was boycotted by major advertisers as a result of the paper's support, which turned the paper into a weekly rather than thrice-weekly publication.

References

External links
 Official website

Weekly newspapers published in California
Livermore, California